Myslkovice is a municipality and village in Tábor District in the South Bohemian Region of the Czech Republic. It has about 400 inhabitants.

Notable people
Josef Kaizl (1854–1901), economist and politician; lived and died here

References

Villages in Tábor District